The Manamadurai–Rameswaram branch line is a branch railway line in the state of Tamil Nadu, India. The line starts at Manamadurai and ends at Rameswaram.

History 

The Madras Railway laid the metre gauge lines viz. Manamadurai–Mandapam line in 1902, Mandapam–Pamban line in 1914, Pamban–Rameswaram line in 1906 and Pamban–Dhanushkodi line in 1908.

During 1964 Rameshwaram Cyclone, the Pamban–Dhanushkodi section was completely damaged and was dismantled afterwards and was never rebuilt by Indian railways. This is because of the declarement of dhanushkodi as 'The Ghost Town' by madras(chennai) government. 

The Madurai–Manamadurai–Rameshwaram section was entirely converted to broad gauge in 2006.

Future 
There are plans to build a rail-cum-road bridge or tunnel from India to Sri Lanka. It would be built via Rameshwaram or Dhanushkodi.

Funds has been allocated for the reconstruction of Dhanushkodi Railway Line.

References

External links
 Southern Railways - Official Website

5 ft 6 in gauge railways in India

Railway lines closed in 1964
Transport in Rameswaram
Railway lines opened in 1908